SummitMedia, LLC is an American radio broadcasting company based in Birmingham, Alabama.  The company formed to purchase mid-market radio stations being divested by Cox Radio in 2013.

On November 1, 2018, SummitMedia acquired 19 stations in four markets from the E. W. Scripps Company.

Stations

References

American companies established in 2013
Companies based in Birmingham, Alabama
Radio broadcasting companies of the United States
2013 establishments in Alabama